Blepharizonia laxa is a California species of tarweed known by the common name glandular big tarweed.

Distribution
The plant is endemic to central California, where it grows in the Central Coast Ranges and adjacent areas of the southern San Francisco Bay Area and Central Valley, from Contra Costa County to as far south as San Luis Obispo County.

It is native to California chaparral and woodlands habitats.

Description
Blepharizonia laxa is similar to its relative, B. plumosa. It tends, however, to be yellow-green rather than gray-green, and covered with many more stalked glands.

References

External links
 Calflora Database: Blepharizonia laxa (Glandular big tarweed)
 UC CalPhotos gallery of Blepharizonia laxa

Madieae
Endemic flora of California
Natural history of the California chaparral and woodlands
Natural history of the California Coast Ranges
Plants described in 1885
Taxa named by Edward Lee Greene
Flora without expected TNC conservation status